Charles-Geneviève-Louis-Auguste-André-Timothée d'Éon de Beaumont or Charlotte-Geneviève-Louise-Augusta-Andréa-Timothéa d'Éon de Beaumont (5 October 172821 May 1810), usually known as the Chevalier d'Éon or the Chevalière d'Éon ( is the female equivalent of , meaning knight), was a French diplomat, spy, and soldier. D'Éon fought in the Seven Years' War, and spied for France while in Russia and England.  D'Éon had androgynous physical characteristics and natural abilities as a mimic and a spy.  D'Éon appeared publicly as a man and pursued masculine occupations for 49 years, although during that time, d'Éon successfully infiltrated the court of Empress Elizabeth of Russia by presenting as a woman. Starting in 1777, d'Éon lived as a woman. Doctors who examined d'Éon's body after death discovered "male organs in every respect perfectly formed", but also feminine characteristics.

Early life

D'Éon was born at the Hôtel d'Uzès in Tonnerre, Burgundy, into a poor French noble family.  D'Éon's father, Louis d'Éon de Beaumont, was an attorney and director of the king's dominions, later mayor of Tonnerre and sub-delegate of the intendant of the généralité of Paris. D'Éon's mother, Françoise de Charanton, was the daughter of a Commissioner General to the armies of the wars of Spain and Italy. Most of what is known about d'Éon's early life comes from a partly ghost-written autobiography, The Interests of the Chevalier d'Éon de Beaumont and Bram Stoker's essay on the Chevalier in his 1910 book Famous Impostors.

D'Éon excelled in school, moving from Tonnerre to Paris in 1743, graduating in civil law and canon law from the Collège Mazarin in 1749 at age 21. D'Éon began literary work as a contributor to Fréron's Année littéraire, and attracted notice as a political writer by two works on financial and administrative questions, which were published in 1753. D'Éon became secretary to Bertier de Sauvigny, intendant of Paris, served as a secretary to the administrator of the fiscal department, and was appointed a royal censor for history and literature by Malesherbes in 1758.

Life as a spy
It sometimes promoted policies that contradicted official policies and treaties. According to d'Éon's memoirs (although there is no documentary evidence to support that account) the monarch sent d'Éon with the Chevalier Douglas, Alexander Peter Mackenzie Douglas, Baron of Kildin, a Scottish Jacobite in French service, on a secret mission to Russia in order to meet Empress Elizabeth and conspire with the pro-French faction against the Habsburg monarchy. At that time the English and French were at odds, and the English were attempting to deny the French access to the Empress by allowing only women and children to cross the border into Russia. D'Éon later claimed having to pass convincingly as a woman or risk being executed by the English upon discovery and therefore travelled disguised as the lady Lia de Beaumont, and served as a maid of honour to the Empress. However, there is little or no evidence to support this and it is now commonly accepted to be a story told to demonstrate how identifying as female had been of benefit to France in the past. Eventually, Chevalier Douglas became French ambassador to Russia, and d'Éon was secretary to the embassy in Saint Petersburg from 1756 to 1760, serving Douglas and his successor, the marquis de l'Hôpital.

D'Éon returned to France in October 1760, and was granted a pension of 2,000 livres as reward for service in Russia. In May 1761, d'Éon became a captain of dragoons under the maréchal de Broglie and fought in the later stages of the Seven Years' War. D'Éon served at the Battle of Villinghausen in July 1761, and was wounded at Ultrop. After Empress Elizabeth died in January 1762, d'Éon was considered for further service in Russia, but instead was appointed secretary to the duc de Nivernais, awarded 1,000 livres, and sent to London to draft the peace treaty that formally ended the Seven Years' War. The treaty was signed in Paris on 10 February 1763, and d'Éon was awarded a further 6,000 livres, and received the Order of Saint-Louis on 30 March 1763, becoming the Chevalier d'Éon.  The title , French for knight, is also sometimes used for French noblemen.

Back in London, d'Éon became chargé d'affaires in April 1763, and then plenipotentiary minister—essentially interim ambassador—when the duc de Nivernais returned to Paris in July.  D'Éon used this position also to spy for the king.  D'Éon collected information for a potential invasion—an unfortunate and clumsy initiative of Louis XV, of which Louis's own ministers were unaware—assisting a French agent, Louis François Carlet de la Rozière, who was surveying the British coastal defences. D'Éon formed connections with English nobility by sending them the produce of d'Éon's vineyard in France; d'Éon abundantly enjoyed the splendour of this interim embassy.

Upon the arrival of the new ambassador, the comte de Guerchy in October 1763, d'Éon was demoted to the rank of secretary and humiliated by the count. D'Éon was trapped between two French factions: Guerchy was a supporter of the duc de Choiseul, duc de Praslin and Madame de Pompadour, in opposition to the comte de Broglie and his brother the maréchal de Broglie.  D'Éon complained, and eventually decided to disobey orders to return to France. In a letter to the king, d'Éon claimed that the new ambassador had tried to drug d'Éon at a dinner at the ambassador's residence in Monmouth House in Soho Square. The British government declined a French request to extradite d'Éon, and the 2,000 livres pension that had been granted in 1760 was stopped in February 1764.  In an effort to save d'Éon's station in London, d'Éon published much of the secret diplomatic correspondence about d'Éon's recall under the title Lettres, mémoires et négociations particulières du chevalier d'Éon in March 1764, disavowing Guerchy and calling him unfit for the job.  This breach of diplomatic discretion was scandalous to the point of being unheard of, but d'Éon had not yet published everything (the King's secret invasion documents and those relative to the Secret du Roi were kept back as "insurance"), and the French government became very cautious in its dealings with d'Éon, even when d'Éon sued Guerchy for attempted murder. With the invasion documents in hand, d'Éon held the king in check.  D'Éon did not offer any defence when Guerchy sued for libel, and d'Éon was declared an outlaw and went into hiding.  However, d'Éon secured the sympathy of the British public: the mob jeered Guerchy in public, and threw stones at his residence.  D'Éon then wrote a book on public administration, Les loisirs du Chevalier d'Éon, which was published in thirteen volumes in Amsterdam in 1774.

Guerchy was recalled to France, and in July 1766 Louis XV granted d'Éon a pension (possibly a pay-off for d'Éon's silence) and a 12,000-livre annuity, but refused a demand for over 100,000 livres to clear d'Éon's extensive debts. D'Éon continued to work as a spy, but lived in political exile in London. D'Éon's possession of the king's secret letters provided protection against further actions, but d'Éon could not return to France. D'Éon became a Freemason in 1768, and was initiated at London's Immortality Lodge.

Life as a woman

Despite the fact that d'Éon habitually wore a dragoon's uniform, rumours circulated in London that d'Éon was actually a woman. A betting pool was started on the London Stock Exchange about d'Éon's true sex. D'Éon was invited to join, but declined, saying that an examination would be dishonouring, whatever the result. After a year without progress, the wager was abandoned. The writer Pierre de Beaumarchais represented the French government in the negotiations.

Madame Campan writes in her memoirs: "This eccentric being had long solicited permission to return to France; but it was necessary to find a way of sparing the family he had offended the insult they would see in his return; he was therefore made to resume the costume of that sex to which in France everything is pardoned. The desire to see his native land once more determined him to submit to the condition, but he revenged himself by combining the long train of his gown and the three deep ruffles on his sleeves with the attitude and conversation of a grenadier, which made him very disagreeable company."

The Chevalier d'Éon claimed to have been assigned female at birth, and demanded recognition by the government as such. D'Éon claimed to have been raised as a boy because Louis d'Éon de Beaumont could only inherit from his in-laws if he had a son. King Louis XVI and his court complied with this demand, but required in turn that d'Éon dress appropriately in women's clothing, although d'Éon was allowed to continue to wear the insignia of the Order of Saint-Louis. When the king's offer included funds for a new wardrobe of women's clothes, d'Éon agreed. In 1777, after fourteen months of negotiation, d'Éon returned to France and as punishment was banished to Tonnerre.

When France began to help the rebels during the American War of Independence, d'Éon asked to join the French troops in America, but d'Éon's banishment prevented it. In 1779, d'Éon published a book of memoirs: La Vie Militaire, politique, et privée de Mademoiselle d'Éon. They were ghostwritten by a friend named La Fortelle and are probably embellished. D'Éon was allowed to return to England in 1785.

The pension that Louis XV had granted was ended by the French Revolution, and d'Éon had to sell personal possessions, including books, jewellery and plate. The family's properties in Tonnerre were confiscated by the revolutionary government. In 1792, d'Éon sent a letter to the French National Assembly offering to lead a division of female soldiers against the Habsburgs, but the offer was rebuffed. D'Éon participated in fencing tournaments until seriously wounded in Southampton in 1796. D'Éon's last years were spent with a widow, Mrs. Cole. In 1804, d'Éon was sent to a debtors' prison for five months, and signed a contract for a biography to be written by Thomas William Plummer, which was never published. D'Éon became paralyzed following a fall, and spent a final four years bedridden, dying in poverty in London on 21 May 1810 at the age of 81.

The surgeon who examined d'Éon's body attested in their post-mortem certificate that the Chevalier had "male organs in every respect perfectly formed", while at the same time displaying feminine characteristics. A couple of characteristics described in the certificate were "unusual roundness in the formation of limbs", as well as "breast remarkably full".

D'Éon's body was buried in the churchyard of St Pancras Old Church, and d'Éon's remaining possessions were sold by Christie's in 1813. D'Éon's grave is listed on the Burdett-Coutts Memorial there as one of the important graves lost.

Legacy

Some of d'Éon's papers are at the Brotherton Library in Leeds, England.

Some modern scholars have interpreted d'Éon as transgender. Havelock Ellis coined the term eonism to describe similar cases of transgender behavior; it is rarely used now. The Beaumont Society, a long-standing organisation for transgender people, is named after d'Éon.

In 2012, a 1792 painting (shown above) by Thomas Stewart was identified as a portrait of d'Éon, and was purchased by the National Portrait Gallery, London.

The Burdett-Coutts Memorial at St Pancras Gardens in London commemorates d'Éon as well as other people; in 2016 Historic England upgraded it to a Grade II* listed structure.

Cultural depictions
The Chevalier d'Éon has appeared as a character in numerous fictional works.

 The Chevalière d'Eon, by Charles Dupeuty and the Baron de Maldigny (1837), Théâtre du Vaudeville 
 The Chevalier d'Eon, a comedy in three acts by Dumanoir and Jean-François Bayard (1837), Théâtre des Variétés 
Anne Dancrey created the title role
 Spy of Madame Pompadour (1928), film.
 Le secret du Chevalier d'Éon (1959), a film loosely based on the life of the Chevalier that portrays d'Éon as a woman masquerading as a man.
 By Plume and Sword (Пером и шпагой), a novel by the Soviet writer Valentin Pikul, written in 1963 and first published in 1972, based on d'Éon's career in Russia.
Beaumarchais (1996), a film depicting episodes in the life of Pierre de Beaumarchais, including negotiations with d'Éon in 1774 over the return of correspondence regarding the secret du roi.
 Le Chevalier D'Eon (2006), an anime series loosely based on the Chevalier d'Éon.
 The Sword of the Chevalier, a 2017 episode of the Doctor Who audio series, The Tenth Doctor Adventures, which sees the Chevalier meeting the Tenth Doctor (David Tennant) and Rose Tyler (Billie Piper) and assisting them in thwarting alien slavers who intend to destroy Earth to drive up the market price of their captives.
 Le Chevalier d'Éon appears as an unplayable character that gives out side-quests in the game Assassin's Creed: Unity.
 History of a French Louse; or The Spy of a New Species, in France and England in British it-Narratives 1750-1830 (2012), Le Chevalier d'Éon is portrayed as a nameless character in which a louse inhabits for a period of time.
 The Chevalier d'Éon: The 18th Century Transgender Spy (2022), a biographical short documentary directed by Jono Namara for BBC Worldwide.
 Innocent (2013-2015), a Manga series by Shin'ichi Sakamoto briefly depicting the Chevalier d'Eon as a side character.
 Fate/Grand Order, which depicts the Chevalier d'Eon as a character in a free-to-play video game, voiced by Chiwa Saitō.

References

Further reading
 Decker, Michel de. Madame Le Chevalier d'Éon, Paris: Perrin, 1987, .
 d'Éon De Beaumont, Charles. The Maiden of Tonnerre: The Vicissitudes of the Chevalier and the Chevalière d'Éon, Baltimore, MD: Johns Hopkins University Press, 2001, .
 d'Éon, Leonard J. The Cavalier, New York: G.P. Putnam's Sons, 1987, .
 Frank, André, with Jean Chaumely. D'Éon chevalier et chevalière: sa confession inédite, Paris: Amiot-Dumont, 1953.
 Fortelle M. de la. La Vie militaire, politique et privée de Demoiselle Charles-Geneviève-Auguste-Andrée-Thimothée Éon ou d'Èon de Beaumont, [... etc.], Paris: Lambert, 1779.
 Gaillardet, F. (ed.), Mémoires du chevalier d'Éon, Paris, 1836, 2 vols.
 Gontier, Fernande. Homme ou femme? La confusion des sexes, Paris: Perrin, 2006, Chapter 6. .
 Homberg, O., and F. Jousselin, Un Aventurier au XVIIIe siècle: Le Chevalier D'Éon (1728–1810), Paris: Plon-Nourrit, 1904.
 Kates, Gary. Monsieur d'Éon Is a Woman: A Tale of Political Intrigue and Sexual Masquerade, Baltimore, MD: Johns Hopkins University Press, 2001, .
 Lever, Évelyne and Maurice. Le Chevalier d'Éon: Une vie sans queue ni tête, Paris: Fayard, 2009, .
 Luyt, Philippe. D'Éon de Tonnerre. Iconographie et histoire, 2007, 
 Mourousy, Paul. Le Chevalier d'Éon: un travesti malgré lui, Paris: Le Rocher, 1998, .
 Musée municipal de Tonnerre, Catalogue bilingue de l'exposition, Le Chevalier d'Éon: secrets et lumières, 2007.
 Royer, Jean-Michel. Le Double Je, ou les Mémoires du chevalier d'Éon, Paris: Grasset & Fasquelle, 1986, .
 Telfer, John Buchan, The strange career of the Chevalier d'Eon de Beaumont, minister plenipotentiary from France to Great Britain in 1763, 1885,

External links

 British Museum, Le Chevalier d'Eon, 1764, portrait
 British Museum, Mademoiselle La Chevaliere D'Eon de Beaumont, portrait
 British Museum, George Dance, Chevalier D'Eon, Graphite with watercolour, bodycolour and red stump, England, 1793, portrait and biography.
 British Museum, Chevalière d'Eon, satire
 British Museum, Additional holdings
 
 An account by the Beaumont Society
 The Character of Chevalier d'Éon
 National Portrait Gallery: Portrait by Thomas Stewart, The Chevalier d’Eon
 The Strange Case of the Chevalier d’Eon, History Today Volume 60, Issue 4, 2010 
Famous Trannies in Early Modern Times

Archival material at the Rubenstein Library, Duke University

1728 births
1810 deaths
People from Yonne
18th-century French diplomats
French knights
French spies
French transgender people
University of Paris alumni
French people of the Seven Years' War
18th-century spies
18th-century LGBT people
French Freemasons
Transgender military personnel
Intersex people
Intersex in history
Intersex military personnel
French expatriates in the United Kingdom
French expatriates in the Russian Empire
Historical figures with ambiguous or disputed gender identity